Echinoplectanum leopardi is a species of diplectanid monogenean parasitic on the gills of the leopard coralgrouper, Plectropomus leopardus. It has been described in 2006.

Etymology
The specific epithet leopardi is the genitive form of leopardus and relates to the type-host.

Hosts and localities

The leopard  coral grouper Plectropomus leopardus is the type-host of Echinoplectanum leopardi. The type-locality is the coral reef off Nouméa, New Caledonia.
In New Caledonia, this fish harbours three species of the genus Echinoplectanum, namely E. leopardi, E. pudicum and E. rarum.

References

External links 

Diplectanidae
Animals described in 2006
Fauna of New Caledonia